Methods of Mayhem is an American rap rock band formed in 1999 by Tommy Lee, who had temporarily quit his position as Mötley Crüe's drummer.

History
Lee formed Methods of Mayhem on the eve of his divorce from Pamela Anderson. The band's self-titled debut album was released in late 1999 and went on to be certified gold. The album featured appearances by Fred Durst, Crystal Method, U-God, Kid Rock, Snoop Dogg, Lil' Kim, George Clinton and Mix Master Mike. "It's pretty good for what it is," Lee's former Mötley Crüe band member Nikki Sixx conceded in 2000, "I guess you'd call it rap-rock." The band disbanded for the first time in September 2000.

In March 2009, Lee announced that he was reforming Methods of Mayhem and would start recording new music. Drummer Will Hunt, guitarist J3, guitarist Phil X (who contributed to the first album), and touring bassist Marty O'Brien contributed to the sophomore album, A Public Disservice Announcement, released in September 2010. A live performance on The Tonight Show with Jay Leno saw Morgan Rose (of Sevendust) playing drums, DJ Aero on turntables, J3 on guitar and vocals, and Lee on vocals and guitar. No bass player was on stage during the performance. Methods of Mayhem later signed to Loud & Proud/Roadrunner Records.

On April 2, 2019, it was announced that Lee had resurrected the project and had plans to release a new album in the future.

Style 

The band's self-titled debut featured a rap metal style, while A Public Disservice Announcement was more varied in style, covering genres such as rap rock, nu metal and dance-rock.

Band members

Current members
 Tommy Lee – lead vocals, rhythm guitar, drums 
 DJ Aero – turntables, electronics 
 Marty O'Brien – bass , synthesizer, backing vocals 
 John "J3" Allen III – lead guitar, co-lead vocals 
 Morgan Rose – drums  

Former members
 Stephen Perkins – drums 
 Will Hunt – drums 
 TiLo – vocals 
 Chris Chaney – bass 
 Mix Master Mike – turntables 
 Kai Marcus – lead guitar, backing vocals 

Timeline

Discography

Singles

 "Get Naked" (1999)
 "New Skin" (1999)
 "Fight Song" (2010)
 "Time Bomb" (2010)

References

External links
[ AllMusic biography]
DJ Aero

Musical groups established in 1999
Musical groups disestablished in 2000
Musical groups reestablished in 2009
Musical groups disestablished in 2011
Musical groups reestablished in 2019
Rap metal musical groups
MCA Records artists
1999 establishments in California